K. K. Aggarwal (born 1948) is an engineer and professor who has worked in the fields of computer engineering and information technology. He is the founder vice chancellor of the Guru Gobind Singh Indraprastha University. He served as the president of the Computer Society of India from 2007 to 2009 and held the position of the vice president of the South East Asia Regional Computer Confederation from 2008 to 2009 and then as the president for a year afterwards.

Academic life
Aggarwal obtained his engineering degree in electronics and communication from the Panjab University in 1968 and M.Sc.-engineering in advanced electronics from the Kurukshetra University in 1971. He got his Ph.D. from the Kurukshetra University with a thesis on "Reliability Evaluation and Optimization" in 1975, in the same year he became a professor.

References

External links
Official Website of Prof.K.K.Aggarwal
Official Website of Guru Gobind Singh Indraprastha University

1948 births
Living people
People from Delhi
Vice-Chancellors of Guru Gobind Singh Indraprastha University
Kurukshetra University alumni
Panjab University alumni